The Eleutheros Cooke House, also known as the Cooke-Dorn House, at 1415 Columbus Avenue in Sandusky, Ohio is a three-story, limestone Greek Revival style house that was built in 1844.  It was the last home of Eleutheros Cooke, one of the first settlers in Sandusky and its first lawyer.  Eleutheros was father of Jay Cooke, the Civil War financier.

It was listed on the National Register of Historic Places in 1982.

The house is owned by the Ohio Historical Society and is open seasonally as a historic house museum that has been restored to a 1950s appearance. It is managed locally by the Old House Guild of Sandusky.

See also
Eleutheros Cooke House (410 Columbus Avenue, Sandusky, Ohio), also built by Eleutheros Cooke, on the same street

References

External links
Cooke-Dorn House - Ohio Historical Society
 Cooke House - Old House Guild

Houses on the National Register of Historic Places in Ohio
Greek Revival houses in Ohio
Buildings and structures in Sandusky, Ohio
Houses completed in 1844
Ohio History Connection
Historic house museums in Ohio
Museums in Erie County, Ohio
National Register of Historic Places in Erie County, Ohio
Houses in Erie County, Ohio
Tourist attractions in Sandusky, Ohio